Compsibidion angulare is a species of beetle in the family Cerambycidae. It was described by Thomson in 1867.

References

Compsibidion
Beetles described in 1867